The 1991–92 Sussex County Football League season was the 67th in the history of Sussex County Football League a football competition in England.

Division One

Division One featured 16 clubs which competed in the division last season, along with two new clubs, promoted from Division Two:
Chichester City
Newhaven

League table

Division Two

Division Two featured 13 clubs which competed in the division last season, along with four new clubs.
Clubs relegated from Division One:
Seaford Town
Selsey
Clubs promoted from Division Three:
East Grinstead
East Preston

League table

Division Three

Division Three featured eleven clubs which competed in the division last season, along with three new clubs:
Franklands Village, relegated from Division Two
Lindfield Rangers
Sidlesham

League table

References

1991-92
1991–92 in English football leagues